Kuchenbecker is a German language surname. Notable people with the surname include:
Fernanda Kuchenbecker (born 1992), Brazilian volleyball player
Katherine Kuchenbecker, American volleyball player and haptics researcher
Otto Kuchenbecker (1907–1990), German basketball player

German-language surnames